Besik Aslanasvili (born October 22, 1976, in Tbilisi, Georgian SSR) is a retired amateur Greek freestyle wrestler, who competed in the men's lightweight category. Holding a dual citizenship to compete internationally, Aslanasvili has been selected to the nation's Olympic wrestling team when Greece hosted the 2004 Summer Olympics in Athens, and also picked up a gold medal in the 63-kg division at the 2001 Mediterranean Games in Tunis, Tunisia. Throughout his sporting career, Aslanasvili trained full-time for Atlas Kallitheas Wrestling Club in Athens, under personal coach Michail Charachura.

Aslanasvili qualified for the naturalized Greek squad in the men's lightweight class (60 kg), when Greece welcomed the world to the 2004 Summer Olympics in Athens. He filled up an entry by the International Federation of Association Wrestling and the Hellenic Olympic Committee, as Greece received an automatic berth for being the host nation. Amassed the home crowd inside Ano Liossia Olympic Hall, Aslanasvili opened the prelim pool with a shut out 5–2 victory over neighboring Albania's Sahit Prizreni, before losing to Iran's Masoud Mostafa-Jokar by a rigid 3–2 decision. Placing second in the pool and eleventh in the final standings, Aslanasvili's performance was not enough to put him further into the medal rounds.

References

External links
Profile – International Wrestling Database

1976 births
Living people
Olympic wrestlers of Greece
Wrestlers at the 2004 Summer Olympics
Georgian emigrants to Greece
Sportspeople from Tbilisi
Greek male sport wrestlers
Mediterranean Games gold medalists for Greece
Competitors at the 2001 Mediterranean Games
Mediterranean Games medalists in wrestling